Davis Mill may refer to the following places:
Davis Mill, New Brunswick, Canada
Davis Mill (Nevada City, California), listed on the National Register of Historic Places
Davis Mill (Gallia County, Ohio), listed on the National Register of Historic Places